Hajnal may refer to:

 Hajnal (name)
 Hajnal line, a division of Europe into areas characterized by a different levels of nuptiality
 "Hajnal", a song by Venetian Snares from Rossz csillag alatt született